Stefanie von Siebenthal (born 8 November 1977) is a Swiss snowboarder. 

Siebenthal was born in  Saanen. She competed at the 1998 Winter Olympics, in giant slalom, and at the 2002 Winter Olympics.

References

External links 
 

1977 births
Living people
Sportspeople from Bern
Swiss female snowboarders
Olympic snowboarders of Switzerland
Snowboarders at the 1998 Winter Olympics
Snowboarders at the 2002 Winter Olympics